Wanted – A Bad Man is a 1917 American comedy film featuring Oliver Hardy. The film was produced by the Vim Comedy Company.

Cast
 Ethel Marie Burton (as Ethel Burton)
 Oliver Hardy (as Babe Hardy)
 Bud Ross (as Budd Ross)

See also
 List of American films of 1917

External links

1917 films
1917 comedy films
1917 short films
Silent American comedy films
American silent short films
American black-and-white films
Films directed by Oliver Hardy
American comedy short films
1910s American films